Colombia debuted in the OTI Festival in the first edition of the show which was held in Madrid. This country took part in the festival since 1972 to 1998 but in the 27th edition of the festival in 2000, the Colombian broadcasters decided to withdraw from the event due to the bad results from 1992 on.

History 
RCN and Caracol Television were the Colombian broadcasters that organised the Colombian entries in the OTI festival. All the entrants were internally selected except from 1992 when a national final was held.

During the Colombian history in this festival, the country got three third places, one of them in 1975 with Leonor Gonzalez Mina and in 1973 with Jaime Mora. The country also managed to get the second place in 1991 with Juan Carlos Coronel and his song "Advices, a song for my son". The participating broadcasters of this South American country never managed to get the victory.

As an interesting data in 1992 Shakira was initially selected to represent her country in the festival but she could not compete because she was under age. As a result, the second classificate was selected to represent Colombia in the event.

Contestants 

OTI Festival